SS (RMS) Snaefell (I) – the first ship in the Company's history to bear the name – was an iron paddle steamer that served with the Isle of Man Steam Packet Company until she was sold in 1875.

Construction and dimensions
Snaefell was the first of three similar vessels to be built for the Company by Caird & Co. of Greenock. Costing £22,000, she entered service in 1863.

Length 236'; beam 26'; depth 14'.

All three sisters – Snaefell, Douglas and Tynwald were driven by two-cylinder oscillating engines with in the case of Snaefell, a nominal horsepower of 240, producing an indicated horsepower of approximately 1,300.

Snaefell was reboilered in 1869 for £3,500 (equivalent to £ in ).

Service life

On 19 September 1863, Snaefell collided with the Mersey Flat Mary Agnes at Liverpool. Mary Agnes sank with the loss of two lives. On 20 October 1864, she collided with the steamship Hibernia at Liverpool whilst bound for Douglas. Severely damaged and flooded at the bows, she put back to Liverpool.

She ran aground at Liverpool on 22 June 1871, after which her Master, Capt. Corlett tendered his resignation. The Company's shareholders asked the board to reappoint him, but after much discussion the board declined. Capt. Thomas Lewis was given command at a salary of £225 (equivalent to £ in ) a year, reduced to half pay during lay up.

Disposal
After only 12 years with the Manx fleet, Snaefell was put up for sale. She was sold to the Royal Netherlands Steamship Company of Amsterdam for £15,500 (equivalent to £ in ) in 1875. She was renamed the Stad Breda and plied between Sheerness and Flushing. In 1888, she was sold for scrapping.

References

Bibliography

 Chappell, Connery (1980). Island Lifeline T.Stephenson & Sons Ltd 

Passenger ships of the United Kingdom
Ships of the Isle of Man Steam Packet Company
Steamships
1863 ships
Paddle steamers of the United Kingdom
Ferries of the Isle of Man
Steamships of the United Kingdom
Merchant ships of the United Kingdom
Maritime incidents in October 1864
Maritime incidents in June 1871
Ships built on the River Clyde